Alex Mingle (born 1948) is a Ghanaian footballer. He competed in the men's tournament at the 1972 Summer Olympics.

References

External links
 

1948 births
Living people
Ghanaian footballers
Ghana international footballers
Olympic footballers of Ghana
Footballers at the 1972 Summer Olympics
1970 African Cup of Nations players
Place of birth missing (living people)
Association football defenders